Fister is a village in Hjelmeland municipality in Rogaland county, Norway. The village is a small community approximately 600 inhabitants, and is located on the mainland, along the Fisterfjorden, a branch off the main Boknafjorden.

Fister has the highest average temperature in Norway. It is visited by many tourists each year and is famous for the beautiful nature and fishing in the fjords.

Local community 
This small village is well known for its warm, inviting atmosphere and friendly community. It has an elementary school, a locally owned store (Joker Fister), a variety of local food options, small businesses, vibrant nature and an abundance of hiking options.

The local community council, Fister bygdaråd, serves as an informal communication channel across the community where people can reach each other with questions, follow events and keep up to date on recent developments locally. It's an open group where anyone are welcome to join.

History
The village of Fister was the administrative centre of the municipality of Fister which existed from 1884 (when the old municipality of Hjelmeland og Fister was split) until 1965 (when Fister was dissolved and merged into the municipalities of Hjelmeland and Finnøy).

Fister Church is located in the village.  It  was built in 1867 using plans drawn by the architect, Hans Linstow, who designed several churches in Norway, in addition to the Royal Palace, Oslo.

References

External links
#fisteriryfylke Fister instagram 
Fister bygdaråd - local community group and volunteer organization
gronvikgard.no local apple orchard and store
Joker Fister - local grocery store in the heart of Fister
Mandy's atelier - local glass art gallery

Hjelmeland
Villages in Rogaland